"kaivalagi" is a Fijian word meaning someone "from the land of the foreigners." Its antonym, kaiviti, means "someone from Fiji."  It is often used instead of the word "vulagi", meaning foreigner or stranger. In practice, "kaivalagi" usually means "white person" or "European" (which in Fiji English also includes white people from America and Australasia), whilst "vulagi" can include all non-Fijians.

Similar words for "white man" exist in most Melanesian, Polynesian and Micronesian languages: For example, in the Cook Islands - "Papa'a"; New Zealand - "Pakeha"; New Caledonian slang - "poken" (although this is used only for English speaking foreigners); Hawaii - "Haole"; Samoa - "Palagi"; Tonga - "Papalagi"; Marshall Islands - "ri-Likin"  etc.

See also

Culture of Fiji

References

Fijian culture